Bepanah Pyaar is an Indian romantic mystery television series created by Ekta Kapoor. It premiered on June 3, 2019 on Colors TV. It stars Pearl V Puri, Aparna Dixit and Ishita Dutta. The show went off air after 190 episodes on February 28, 2020, and was replaced by Pavitra Bhagya.

Timeslot: 10PM

Replaced By: Pavitra Bhagya

Plot

After the loss of his wife Bani, Raghbir is ready to marry his friend from childhood, Misha. Still missing Bani, he ruminates on their connection and has nightmares about the accident in which Bani was killed when a railing broke way. Sukanya Rai Singhania, who claims Raghbir wedded her in London, attends the wedding. As a result, the wedding is called off despite his denial of any link between them.

Raghbir enlists the help of Pragati, a new employee in his office, to discover the truth. They end up falling in love and marrying as they uncover Sukanya's deception. Raghbir tells her that he still has feelings for Bani. Pragati discovers that Bani was pregnant at the time of her death, and that one of Raghbir's relatives tampered with the railing to cause it to give way. She falls in love with Raghbir and believes Sanket's accident was caused by Bani's murderer. 

When Pragati discovers a tape recorder on which Raghbir threatens to kill Bani, she is taken aback. Bani, who did not die but underwent plastic surgery and returned as Pragati to exact her revenge on Raghbir, was revealed to be Pragati. She later learns that the hooded figure is not Raghbir. Harshit and his accomplice are found guilty of causing Bani's accident. Bani, on the other hand, discovers Kunti is the brains behind the operation. 

Intoxicated, Raghbir realises his love for her (unaware she is his first love Bani) and wants to give their marriage a chance. Bani decides to tell Raghbir the truth about her false identity "Pragati," which he has recently discovered and despises her for. Saahas comes in to assist her. Bani reappears, claiming 51 percent of the property that was a pre-accident agreement between Raghbir and her company. 

Saahas, on the other hand, wants to separate Bani and Raghbir since he has loved Bani since they met in college. Raghbir, meantime, learns of Bani's love and Kunti's crimes. He is in danger of becoming involved in an accident. If Bani wants Saahas to cure Raghbir, he asks her to marry him. She concurs. Raghbir battles Saahas after learning the truth, injuring his skull, and finally losing his memories. later kunti say wrong things about pragati to raghbir and he just shouts on her. all this is being recorded by the whole family that kunti is telling all fake information about pragati to raghbir. later harshit decide to join pragati and leave his mother kunti for betraling him for money and tells whole thing to pragati. pragati take raghbir to manali where she fall from the cliff and soon raghbir recalls everything and they reunite.

Cast

Main

 Pearl V Puri as Raghbir Malhotra – Aditi and Devraj's second son; Harshit, Nakul, Shefali and Priya's brother; Pragati's husband. 
 Ishita Dutta as Pragati Malhotra – Raghbir's wife. (After plastic surgery). (2019–2020)
 Aparna Dixit as Bani Malhotra - Raghbir's wife. (Before plastic surgery)
 Sudha Chandran as Kunti Shah Malhotra, the main antagonist (2019–2020)

Recurring

 Manish Goplani as Dr Saahas Rajveer Banerjee (2019–2020)
 Manoj Chandila as Harshit Devraj Malhotra - Aditi and Devraj's eldest son - eldest brother of Raghbir, Nakul, Shefali, and Priya and husband of Tina.
 Devika Singh as Sukanya Raisinghania (2019)
 Karan Thakur (actor) as Angad Singh. 
 Aashish Kaul as Devraj Amitabh Malhotra (2019–2020)
 Ekta Sharma as Aditi Salgaonkar/Aditi Devraj Malhotra (2019–2020)
 Tanvi Thakkar as Tina Shukla/Tina Harshit Malhotra (2019–2020)
 Adhik Mehta as Nakul Devraj Malhotra - Aditi and Devraj's third son - younger brother of Harshit and Raghbir. Elder brother of Shefali and Priya.
 Mehak Ghai as Shefali Devraj Malhotra - Aditi and Devraj's daughter - youngest sister of Harshit, Raghbir, and Nakul. elder sister of Priya.
 Sophiya Kiran Singh as Priya Devraj Malhotra-Aditi and Devraj's youngest daughter- youngest sister of Harshit, Raghbir, Nakul, and Shefali. 
 Nikhlesh Rathore as Devansh Mihir Dixit
 Ankur Verma as Raghav Sharma
 Mandeep Bamra as Sanket
 Sachin Parikh as Gopinath Salgaonkar/Gopi
 Chitrapama Banerjee as Shalini Gopinath Salgaonkar (2019–2020)
 Kulbir Badesron as Sonarika Amitabh Malhotra (2019–2020)
 Neha Chandra as Divyajot Amitabh Malhotra
 Mahira Sharma as Misha Oberoi (2019)
 Tasneem Ali as Aisha Mihir Dixit
 Darpan Srivastava as Prashant Ahuja
 Mandeep Bamra as Sanket Ahuja
 Ravi Gossain as Gulshan Saxena

References

External links
 Official Website
 

Balaji Telefilms television series
2019 Indian television series debuts
Indian drama television series
Colors TV original programming
Hindi-language television shows
Television shows set in Pune